Zeta is the sixth letter of the Greek alphabet.

Zeta or ZETA may also refer to:

Manufacturing 

 GM Zeta platform, a full-size car series
 Zeta (automobile), an Australian car produced by Lightburn

Organizations 

 FK Zeta, a Montenegrin football club
 Los Zetas, a criminal drug cartel in Mexico
 Zeta Global, an internet marketing firm
 Zeta India, an India fintech firm

People
Zeta (name), list of people and fictional characters with the name

Places 

 Zeta Banovina, a province of the Kingdom of Yugoslavia between 1929 and 1941
 Zeta (medieval region), a medieval region in southern parts of modern Montenegro and some northern parts of Albania
 Zeta (crown land), a part of the medieval Serbian state, from the end of the 12th to the middle of the 14th century
 Principality of Zeta, a medieval principality, from the middle of the 14th up to the end of the 15th century
 Zeta Plain, a plain in Montenegro
 Zeta (river), a river in Montenegro
 Zeta, Missouri, a ghost town in the United States

Science and meteorology 

 Zeta distribution, a discrete probability distribution
 ZETA (fusion reactor), the Zero-Energy Toroidal (or Thermonuclear) Assembly reactor, a British test facility
 Zeta (wasp) a genus of potter wasps
 Zeta pinch or Z-pinch, a type of plasma confinement system
 Zeta potential, the electrokinetic potential of a colloidal system
 Atlantic Basin tropical cyclones:
 Tropical Storm Zeta (2005)
 Hurricane Zeta (2020)
 Riemann zeta function, a function used in analytic number theory
 Zeta function, any of a number of functions analogous to the Riemann zeta function
 SARS-CoV-2 Zeta variant,  one of the variants of SARS-CoV-2, the virus that causes COVID-19

Video games 

 Mothership Zeta, a location in Fallout 3
 Zeta Metroid, a type of Metroid from the Metroid franchise

Other uses 

 magnussoft ZETA, a computer operating system
 Via de Zenta or Zeta, a medieval road connecting the Adriatic with Nemanjić' Serbia
 Zeta, a Baja California investigative journalism newsweekly
 Zéta, a Hungarian wine grape
 USS Zeta, U.S. Navy ship

See also 

 Zetta-, a prefix in the SI system of units
 Zita (disambiguation)